Adapis (from  , 'without' and   'carpet') is an extinct adapiform primate from the Eocene of Europe. While this genus has traditionally contained five species (A. magnus, A. bruni, A. collinsonae, A. parisiensis, and A. sudrei), recent research has recognized at least six morphotypes that may represent distinct species. Adapis holds the title of the first Eocene primate ever discovered. In 1821, Georges Cuvier, who is considered to be the founding father of paleontology, discovered Adapis in fissure fillings outside of Paris, France.  Given its timing and appearance in the fossil record, Cuvier did not recognize the primate affinities of Adapis and first described it as a small extinct pachyderm; only later in the 19th century was Adapis identified as a primate.

Anatomy
 
Adapis is considered a sexually dimorphic primate, in which males are generally larger in size than females; for example, one study found that compared to females, adult males of Adapis are 44%-56% larger in body weight, have 13-16% longer crania, and 13%-19% larger in canines. Moreover, males of this genus have relatively broader skulls with more prominent nuchal and sagittal crests. Interestingly, the canine dimorphism in Adapis is distinct from the form of canine dimorphism exhibited in Notharctus, another adapiform genus found in the Eocene of North America. The fossil crania of Adapis exhibit relatively small orbits which suggests a diurnal activity pattern for the genus. They also possess a tall sagittal crest and a strong postorbital constriction of the braincase in order to support massive temporalis muscles that facilitated powerful chewing. The dental anatomy of Adapis is characterized by dominant buccal shearing crests adapted for a folivorous and partially frugivorous diet. The postcranial anatomy of Adapis suggests the taxon was adapted for climbing rather than leaping. For example, the femur shares many features in common with pottos and lorises, but not lemurs. Adapis also has a very short astragalar neck and abbreviated distal elongation of the calcaneus. The ankle morphology of Adapis differs from that of notharctid taxa in its abbreviated astragalar neck and reduced distal aspect of the calcaneus. These features are also consistent with climbing instead of leaping.

Taxonomic diversity
Adapis belongs to the family Adapidae. While there is debate regarding the number of species of Adapis, the morphological variation in the humeri of Adapis suggests anywhere from four to six species could be represented in the genus. Traditionally, five species of Adapis have been recognized, including A. magnus, A. bruni, A. collinsonae, A. parisiensis, and A. sudrei. Recent research showed that some fossil humeri of Adapis exhibit morphology that is comparable to living active arboreal quadrupeds. The evolutionary lineage from Adapis magnus to Adapis parisiensis exhibits reduced body size and canine size.

Geographic and temporal range
Adapis was first discovered in southern France. Fossils are known from the early Eocene, to the early Oligocene.  The extinction of Adapis at the Eocoene-Oligiocene boundary has been considered to be the result of dramatic global cooling and drying. While North American and European adapiforms did not have access to geographic refuge to evade the cooler and drier conditions in the Northern latitudes, adapiforms in Asia were able to retreat to southern geographic regions that did not experience severe cooling and drying, enabling their survival until the Miocene.

History of discovery
The genus was first found and named by Georges Cuvier in 1821. This was the first Eocene primate ever discovered but was first mistakenly identified as an extinct genus of pachyderms. The true identity was not discovered until the 1870s where entire skulls were found in the Quercy region in southern France. Adapis and close relatives were also found in many fissure fillings in southern France.

Paleobiology
While the average body weight of Adapis is estimated to be about 2.0 kg, the genus is represented by an extremely wide range of body size across species compared to other adapiform genera. A. parisiensis appears to have been a medium-sized (compared to the large-bodied A. magnus with an estimated body mass of 8.4-9.0 kg), visually oriented, diurnal, sexually dimorphic arboreal folivore. Examinations of the dental microwear reveal striations on molar wear facets A. magnus, which suggests complex, three-directional mandibular movement during mastication. Adapis has been interpreted as having a diurnal activity pattern due to its small orbits. While some species of Adapis were mainly folivores, other species subsited on a diet that included some fruit. Based on other anatomical features, Adapis is thought to have been a climber rather than a leaper, and most likely had slow to medium slow locomotion. Horizontal movement was also a possibly important means of locomotion. In comparison with living primates, many researchers have considered the body size dimorphism in Adapis as indicative of a polygynous mating system. However, other have interpreted the fossils A. parisiensis as indicative of monogamy, suggesting the taxon was predominately solitary with a small home range. Based on inner ear morphology, Adapis may have been more sensitive to high frequencies rather than low frequencies. This interpretation of inner-ear morphology has led some researchers to compare the social and activity behaviors of A. parisiensis to that of Perodicticus potto and Nycticebus coucang, which are extant primates that are solitary, nocturnal, and monogamous. Moreover, this morphology lends to the hypothesis that A. parisiensis had a small home range with sensitivity to high frequencies that do not broadcast over long distances.

References

Prehistoric strepsirrhines
Eocene primates
Prehistoric primate genera
Fossil taxa described in 1822
Extinct mammals of Europe
Taxa named by Georges Cuvier